Nanay may refer to:

 Nanay River, a river in Peru
 Nanay, tatay, a Filipino children's game
 Bence Nanay, philosopher
 Nanai people, Tungusic people in East Asia and the Russian Far East
 Nanai language, the native language of the Nanai people
Nanay/Nanaya, a Mesopotamian deity